Flicker Rocks Harder is a compilation album from Flicker Records.

Track listing
"Bring Me Down" - Pillar - 3:32
"Moving Mountains" - Kids in the Way - 3:06
"Pop" - Staple -  2:52
"Khampa Nomads" - Mortal Treason - 5:33
"Lose It Again" - Everyday Sunday - 2:48
"Steal the Show" - Stereo Motion - 3:02
"Under The Sun" - The Swift - 3:48
"Emotion" - Subseven - 2:54
"The Truth Hurts" - Fed Up - 3:28
"We Are" - Kids in the Way - 3:04
"The Songwriter" - Staple - 3:36
"Tip Of My Tongue" - Stereo Motion - 3:17
"Mess With Your Mind" - Everyday Sunday - 2:32
"Revolution" - The Swift - 2:42
"Game Of Love" - Subseven - 2:24
"When Looking Back" - Fed Up - 3:45
"War Within" - Mortal Treason - 3:45

2004 compilation albums